The North Penn School District (NPSD) is a large, suburban, regional public school district that consists of thirteen elementary schools, three middle schools, and one high school. It serves the North Penn Valley, a  area in the Montgomery County suburbs of Philadelphia, Pennsylvania.

The district serves the municipalities of North Wales Borough, Lansdale Borough, Hatfield Borough, Upper Gwynedd Township, Towamencin Township, Montgomery Township, and Hatfield Township. The Montgomeryville census-designated place is located in the district.

Line Lexington, which includes small portions of Hilltown Township and New Britain Township in Bucks County, is also contained in the North Penn School District.

The district was created by merging smaller, local districts in 1956. North Penn High School is today one of the largest traditional public high schools in Pennsylvania.

List of schools
 North Penn High School, Towamencin Township
 Northbridge School, Hatfield
 Pennbrook Middle School, North Wales
 Penndale Middle School, Lansdale
 Pennfield Middle School, Hatfield
 A.M. Kulp Elementary School, Hatfield
 Bridle Path Elementary School, Montgomery Township
 General Nash Elementary School, Towamencin Township
 Gwyn Nor Elementary School, Upper Gwynedd Township
 Gywnedd Square Elementary School, Lansdale
 Hatfield Elementary School, Hatfield
 Inglewood Elementary School, Towamencin Township
 Knapp Elementary School, Lansdale
 Montgomery Elementary School, Montgomery Township
 North Wales Elementary School, North Wales
 Oak Park Elementary School, Lansdale
 Walton Farm Elementary School, Towamencin Township
 York Avenue Elementary School, Lansdale

References

External links

North Penn School District

Lansdale, Pennsylvania
School districts established in 1956
School districts in Montgomery County, Pennsylvania
1956 establishments in Pennsylvania